Jeanette Brakewell (born 4 February 1974) has been riding since the age of four and is a professional eventing rider.

She was a member of both the British silver medal team at the Athens Olympics of 2004, and the silver medal team in the same event at the Summer Olympics in Sydney 2000 riding her top horse, Over to You.

With Over to You, Brakewell was for several years a regular member of the British three-day eventing team.  Arguably her best achievement to date was in winning the individual silver medal on this horse at the 2002 FEI World Equestrian Games in Jerez, Spain, 2002 and a team bronze medal at the same event.  With this horse she was a team gold medallist on four occasions at the European Eventing Championships (1999, 2001, 2003, 2005).

References

British event riders
1974 births
Living people
Olympic medalists in equestrian
British female equestrians
Olympic equestrians of Great Britain
Equestrians at the 2000 Summer Olympics
Equestrians at the 2004 Summer Olympics
Medalists at the 2004 Summer Olympics
Medalists at the 2000 Summer Olympics
Olympic silver medallists for Great Britain